inter.funda.stifle is the second full-length album by alternative rock band Fair to Midland. Tracks including "Dance of the Manatee," "Vice/Versa," "A Seafarer's Knot," "The Walls of Jericho," "Kyla Cries Cologne," "When the Bough Breaks" and "Upgrade^Brigade" were re-recorded for their later album and major label debut, Fables from a Mayfly: What I Tell You Three Times Is True.

The album features four instrumental songs as independent tracks: "Preambles in 3rd Person," "Cipieron," "Inter.Mission" and "When the Bough Breaks." All of them except for "Preambles in 3rd Person" were re-recorded and used later as instrumental segues for their major debut album.

Reissue
It was announced on July 23, 2009 that Fair to Midland is reissuing the release exclusively through their band merchandise site upon its creation. It was reissued on August 18, 2009 from the band's newly launched merchandise site. They announced that it would be a very limited reissue of about 1000 copies, the first 100 being signed by the band.

Track listing

Personnel
Fair to Midland is (but not limited to)
 Darroh Sudderth — vocals
 Clifford Campbell — guitars
 Nathin Seals — bass
 Brett Stowers — percussion
 Matthew Langley — pianos, etc.

Additional musicians
 Additional vocals on 'Granny Niblo' by Steven Price and Dillan Tomberlin.
 String arrangements on 'Granny Niblo' and 'The Walls of Jericho' performed by Katia Reeb.

Production
 Management by Frank Hill.
 Album artwork by Brett Stowers and inspired by Douglas Florian.
 Recorded and mixed at Reeltime Studios in Denton, TX.
 Mastering done by Sterling Sound.
 Produced and Engineered by Mitch Lerner
 except for 'Inter.mission' and 'Abigail' - Produced and Engineered by Andrew Sudderth.
 'Cipieron' and 'When The Bough Breaks' - Produced and Engineered by Matt Langley.

References

External links
 Official Merch website (No longer working)

2004 albums
Fair to Midland albums
Self-released albums
Art rock albums by American artists